Al Zahra Hospital, Dubai, is a private general hospital in Dubai, United Arab Emirates (UAE). Al Zahra serves some 400,000 outpatients and 23,000 inpatients annually, with a capacity of 137 beds. 

Facilities at the hospital include a 9-bed Intensive Care Unit and a 14-bed long term care and rehabilitation unit as well as seven operating theatres and a number of specialised units.

History 
Al Zahra Hospital Dubai was established in 2013, with the main aim to provide premium medical care and comfort, through state-of-the-art equipment and world class medical experts.

Located on Sheikh Zayed Road, the hospital is Joint Commission International accredited, holding various prestigious certiﬁcations from international accreditation bodies around the world. The state-of-the-art facility has a capacity of 187 beds, serving patients with a broad range of health services, providing personalized service with a focus on clinical outcome through evidence-based medicine.

At Al Zahra Hospital Dubai, the extensive medical team of over 250 doctors and more than 400 nurses are highly experienced in their respective ﬁelds.

And each team member believes in empathetic listening and performing their responsibilities accordingly. The facility was built with the latest advanced technology, while the ambulance services are highly equipped with accreditation from DCAS (Dubai Cooperation for Ambulance Service) and RTA Level 5, for Adult, Pediatric & Neonatal emergencies including patient transfer to and from our hospitals. All the patient rooms are designed to give utmost comfort, with luxurious VIP rooms and stunning views of Dubai’s most treasured landmarks like Atlantis, Burj Al Arab and Sheikh Zayed Road. AZHD strives to provide the highest standards of world class healthcare with an unparalleled level of hospitality.

References 

Hospitals in the United Arab Emirates
Hospitals established in 1981